Felix Schröter (born 23 January 1996) is a German professional footballer who plays as a forward for Tampa Bay Rowdies in the USL Championship.

Career 
In 2015, Schröter joined FC Heidenheim on loan from Schalke 04. He made his 2. Bundesliga debut on 14 August 2015 against Arminia Bielefeld. He replaced Smail Morabit after 77 minutes.

Schröter signed with the Tampa Bay Rowdies of the USL Championship on 23 January 2023.

Career statistics

References 

1996 births
Living people
Sportspeople from Ulm
German footballers
Association football forwards
Footballers from Baden-Württemberg
2. Bundesliga players
3. Liga players
Regionalliga players
Norwegian First Division players
Eliteserien players
USL Championship players
1. FC Heidenheim players
FC Schalke 04 II players
FV Illertissen players
SpVgg Unterhaching players
FK Jerv players
Tampa Bay Rowdies players
German expatriate footballers
German expatriate sportspeople in Norway
Expatriate footballers in Norway
German expatriate sportspeople in the United States
Expatriate soccer players in the United States